Published in 1982, Palace of the White Skunks is the second book of Cuban author Reinaldo Arenas' Pentagonia book series.

Plot summary

The main character, Fortunato, wants to escape the throes of his sisters and parents by joining the revolutionaries vying to overthrow Batista's regime.

Arenas seamlessly weaves in and out of the domestic voices that scream of the emotion and convention that young Fortunato wants to escape.  Despite his courageous efforts, death remains outside in the backyard rolling the wheel of his bicycle.

1982 American novels
Pentagonia novels
Hispanic and Latino American novels
Novels set in Cuba